The 1901 Geneva Covenanters football team was an American football team that represented Geneva College as an independent during the 1901 college football season. In its second season under head coach Samuel G. Craig, the team compiled a 6–1–1 record.

Schedule

References

Geneva
Geneva Golden Tornadoes football seasons
Geneva Covenanters football